All Comes Round is the debut album of Just Jinjer (previously Just Jinger), a contemporary rock group from South Africa. The album was the best selling rock album in South African history.

Track listing
All songs by Matthew/Harris/Scholtz/Tuxx.

 "Too Late"–4:50
 "Ahead Of Time"–3:54
 "Another Day"–4:29
 "What Right"–3:25
 "Pretty One"–4:03
 "All Comes Round"–4:44
 "Father & Father"–4:01
 "Shallow Waters"–4:28
 "No God?"–3:13
 "All Ways"–4:59
 "Traffic Light Blues"–4:24
 "No Idea"–3:08
 "Stand In Your Way"–3:56
 "Bit Of Respect"–4:32
 "Baby Song"–3:31
 "My Life"–2:44

Members
 Art Matthews - vocals, guitar, harmonica
 Verny Scholtz - guitar, keyboards, vocals
 Tuxx - vocals, Bass
 Brent Harris - drums, percussion, vocals

Production
 Producer: Peter Reggie Bowman and Just Jinjer
 Engineer: Peter Reggie Bowman
 Assistant Engineer: Kentse Mpahlha and Verny Scholtz

References

Just Jinjer albums
1997 debut albums